John Vinson Evans (August 5, 1905 – March 11, 1980) was an American football blocking back for the Green Bay Packers of the National Football League (NFL). He played college football for California. He won an NFL championship in 1929 with the Packers.

Biography
Evans was born John Alexander Evans on August 5, 1905, in Colorado Springs, Colorado.

Career
Evans played with the Green Bay Packers during the 1929 NFL season. As such, he was a member of the 1929 NFL Champion Packers.

He played at the University of California, Berkeley.

He died on March 11, 1980, in Santa Ana, California.

See also
List of Green Bay Packers players

References

1905 births
1980 deaths
American football quarterbacks
California Golden Bears football players
Green Bay Packers players
Players of American football from Colorado Springs, Colorado